The 2012 Karnataka video clip controversy, also referred to as Porngate, was a controversy in the Karnataka Legislative Assembly where two ministers of the state cabinet resigned over claims of inappropriate conduct. It is alleged that they viewed a pornographic video on a mobile device while the legislature was in session.

Incident
In February 2012, Spring Zouk, an international festival described as a rave party, was attended by mostly foreign tourists at Udupi beach on at St Mary's Islands. The event is coordinated to increase tourism. At this rave, a video of tourists at the event having sex in public was created and the viewing of this video became the subject of controversy.

At a session of the Karnataka Legislative Assembly, a camera showed two cabinet ministers, Laxman Savadi and C C Patil, allegedly watching pornographic clips on a mobile phone. The ministers said that the video was an investigation of the behavior of foreign tourists at the party on St. Mary's Islands, who were having sex in public and consuming drugs and alcohol at the rave organised by the state tourism department and others.

Reactions

Political
On 8 February, all ministers offered resignation letters and the party accepted their resignations. Former Karnataka chief minister and BJP party leader B. S. Yeddyurappa reprimanded all  officials for their behavior. Anna Hazare called for their imprisonment.

Media
An Indian news source claimed that the international media attention of the event was on how the members of the party who were caught viewing the video were in a party which was especially condemning of this sort of behavior.

The public sought information about this event using Facebook, Twitter, and YouTube. The hashtag "#porngate" was a top trending word on 8 February 2012 on social media site Twitter.

Social
The All India Democratic Women's Association issued a statement that "the anti-women mindset of the former women and child development minister C C Patil, who has been a vocal advocate of dress codes for women, has been thoroughly exposed. The BJP is answerable for justifying and defending hypocrites who indulge in moral policing, while themselves violating all norms of decent behaviour."

References

Political scandals in India
2012 scandals
2012 in India
Politics of Karnataka